Méru is a railway station located in Méru (Oise department), France. It is served by TER Hauts-de-France trains from Paris Nord to Beauvais. The Persan–Méru line opened on 1 July 1875. The line did not reach Beauvais in the north until 15 April 1876, and did not reach Paris in the south until 5 April 1877.

There was at one time a connection to Labosse via a metre gauge branch line.

When the line was electrified with 25 kV 50 Hz alternating current, a third platform track was added to create a partial terminus.

See also

 List of SNCF stations in Hauts-de-France

References

Railway stations in Oise
Railway stations in France opened in 1875